Haris and Panos Katsimihas (Greek: Χάρης/Πάνος Κατσιμίχας), also known as the Katsimihas brothers (Αδελφοί Κατσιμίχα; Κατσιμίχα is the genitive case of Κατσιμίχας) or Katsimiheoi (Κατσιμιχαίοι) (born in Athens, October 1952), are two Greek singer songwriters, who for the greatest part of their music career, performed as a duet. The Katsimihas brothers are twins. Panos is 10 minutes older than Haris.

Early life
They were born in Athens and grew up in the Agios Dimitrios and Nea Smirni area, while they spent their youth working in West Germany.

Initially, they became known from their participation in a music competition in Corfu, organized by Manos Hadjidakis in 1982, where they won the competition with the song "Μια βραδιά στο λούκι" ("A night in Louki") ("Louki was a famous bar in Athens in 80's"). Their first record, "Ζεστά Ποτά" ("Hot Drinks"), was produced in 1985 by Manolis Rasoulis.

Career
In a career spanning 20 years, the brothers have produced their own records featuring their own compositions. They have appeared live in Athens and produced records with other musicians. In 2001 Haris stopped his live performances, unlike Panos. They re-united with a concert at the Olympic Stadium.

Discography
1985-Zesta Pota
1987-Otan sou leo portokali na vgeneis
1989-Aprili Psefti
1992-I monaxia tou Schoinovati
1994-Tis Agapis Machairia
1996-I Agelasti Politeia kai oi Kalikantzaroi
1997-Parallili Diskografia
2000-Trypies Simaies
2001-20 Chronia Live
2002-Stous Elaiones tis Agapis
2006-Mousiki Aftoviografia

References

1952 births
Living people
20th-century Greek male singers
Greek rock singers
Greek songwriters
Singers from Athens
Greek twins
Twin musical duos
Male musical duos
21st-century Greek male singers